Julius Andreas Bechgaard (19 December 1843 [different 22 December] – 4 March 1917) was a Danish composer of piano pieces, songs, and operas.

Bechgaard was born in Copenhagen. His best known opera, Frode, shows the influence of Wagner.  He died aged 73 in Frederiksberg.

Works
op. 60: Troldbunden (Song with lyrics by A. Wallén, manuscript)
Velsign vort Hjem (Song for Men's Choir with lyrics by Vilhelm Gregersen, manuscript)
Sømandsliv (Sailor's Farewell, song cycle)
Gud signe dig (God Bless You song)
Seks firstemmige sange (Six Four-Part Songs)
Til Solen (To the Sun)
Aftensuk (Evening Sigh)
Hvile (Rest)
Morgenstemning (Morning Mood)
Elverdansen (Elfin Dance)
Blomsterne tale (Like a Child)
Strandby Folk (musical play in 4 acts by Holger Drachmann with music by Bechgaard, 1883)
Frode (opera, premiered 11 May 1893 in Copenhagen)
Frau Inge (opera, premiered 1894, in Prague)
Kender du Danmark (songs, with lyrics by Oscar Madsen, 1866–1902)

Notes

External links
 Photo
Julius Bechgaard at www.gravsted.dk Grave site

1843 births
1917 deaths
Danish classical composers
Danish male classical composers
Danish opera composers
Male opera composers